This is a list of Chinese schools in the Philippines.

References

External links
 华校一览 – PCERC.org

Chinese-language schools in the Philippines